A.S.D. Francavilla, commonly known as Francavilla, is an Italian football club based in Francavilla al Mare, Abruzzo. Currently it plays in Italy's Serie D.

History
The club was founded in 1927 as U.S. Francavilla, and changed its name into S.S. Francavilla in 1946. At the end of the 1970s, after two years in Serie D, the team reached the Serie C1, the third highest football division of Italy. 

Francavilla played in C1 (the current Lega Pro) for 7 seasons, from 1980 to 1990. In 1984 it won the Anglo-Italian Cup, during the Semi-professional era, defeating Fisher Athletic and Teramo.

After a decade in professional football, the club was relegated in the regional leagues, such as Eccellenza and Promozione. Starting from the 2001–02 season, the team has always played in Eccellenza Abruzzo.

Colors and badge 
The team's main colors are yellow and red.

Honours 
Anglo-Italian Cup (semi-professional era)
 Winners (1): 1984

Former players
 Sergio Magistrelli (1983–1984)
 Bruno Nobili (1982–1985)

References

External links
 ASD Francavilla official website

Football clubs in Abruzzo
Association football clubs established in 1927
1927 establishments in Italy